MBC FM4U is a K-pop, Pop music, Classical music and Entertainment station from Munhwa Broadcasting Corporation. Launched in September 19, 1971 it was South Korean second FM station with TBC Radio (Now KBS Cool FM) being first and KBS Stereo FM (now KBS Classic FM) being third.

Availability

Seoul, Incheon, Gyeonggi Province

Other Provinces 
 Chuncheon MBC FM4U : FM 94.5, 98.3 MHz
 Wonju MBC FM4U : FM 98.9 MHz
 MBC Gangwon Yeongdong (Gangneung) FM4U : FM 94.3, 90.7, 96.9 MHz
 MBC Gangwon Yeongdong (Samcheok) FM4U : FM 98.1, 99.9 MHz
 Daejeon MBC FM4U : FM 97.5 MHz
 MBC Chungbuk FM4U (Cheongju) : FM 99.7 MHz
 MBC Chungbuk FM4U (Chungju) : FM 88.7 MHz
 Jeonju MBC FM4U : FM 99.1 MHz
 Gwangju MBC FM4U : FM 91.5, 95.1 MHz
 Mokpo MBC FM4U : FM 102.3 MHz
 Yeosu MBC FM4U : FM 98.3 MHz
 Daegu MBC FM4U : FM 95.3 MHz
 Andong MBC FM4U : FM 91.3 MHz
 Pohang MBC FM4U : FM 97.9, 94.9, 90.9 MHz
 Busan MBC FM4U : FM 88.9 MHz
 Ulsan MBC FM4U : FM 98.7 MHz
 MBC Gyeongnam FM4U (Jinju) : FM 97.7, 96.1 MHz
 MBC Gyeongnam FM4U (Changwon) : FM 100.5 MHz
 Jeju MBC FM4U : FM 90.1, 102.9, 102.5 MHz

History 
 September 19, 1971 - MBC FM Launched. (call sign HLKV-FM, FM frequency 91.9 MHz, Power 1 kW)
 1983 - MBC-FM boosted power. (1 kW → 10 kW)
 1986 - MBC-FM Started Nationwide Broadcast.
 1988 - Partial 24 hours broadcasting started. (Monday to Saturday 24 hours, Sunday 21 hours)
 1995 - MBC FM Started 24 hours Broadcasting.
 2001 - Renamed as MBC FM4U.
 2002 - Digital tapeless system conversion completed.
 August 3, 2014 - MBC FM4U broadcasting in Yeouido Island MBC ended. (The building will be torn down soon.)
 August 4, 2014 - MBC FM4U broadcasting in Sang-am dong MBC started.

See also 
 KBS Radio 1
 KBS Radio 2
 EBS FM
 CBS Music FM
 Traffic Broadcasting System
 EBS 1TV
 Far East Broadcasting Company

References 

 https://web.archive.org/web/20160304085131/http://www.chomedia.com/chomedia/business/Radprice.pdf

External links 
 

Radio stations in South Korea
Korean-language radio stations
Radio stations established in 1971
Chinese popular culture
South Korean popular culture